The Human Dignity Award is an award made by the All-Party Oireachtas Life and Dignity Group, recognising people who have contributed to human dignity. The award was set up in 2014 by Senator Rónán Mullen. 

It was originally awarded by the Human Dignity Group, which was founded in 2008 by Mullen. In January 2021, the All-Party Oireachtas Life and Dignity Group, which is co-chaired by TDs Peter Fitzpatrick and Carol Nolan, was established, on whose behalf the award is now awarded.

Recipients
 2014 - Magnus MacFarlane-Barrow, founder of Mary's Meals in Malawi
 2015 - Barney Curley, founder of Direct Aid For Africa
 2016 - Gena Heraty, volunteer worker who runs 'Our Little Brothers and Sisters Orphanage' in Haiti
 2018 - Br. Kevin Crowley and the Capuchin Day Centre
 2019 - Sister Consilio and Cuan Mhuire
 2022 - Ronan Scully, volunteer worker with Self Help Africa and GOAL.

References

Irish awards